Hesychasm (Greek: Ησυχασμός) is a contemplative monastic tradition in the Eastern Orthodox Church in which stillness (hēsychia) is sought through uninterrupted Jesus prayer. While rooted in early Christian monasticism, it took its definitive form in the 14th century at Mount Athos.

Etymology 
Hesychasm (Modern ) derives from the word hesychia, meaning "stillness, rest, quiet, silence" and hesychazo "to keep stillness".

Origins and development
Metropolitan Kallistos Ware, a scholar of Eastern Orthodox theology, distinguishes five distinct usages of the term "hesychasm":
 "solitary life", a sense, equivalent to "eremitical life", in which the term is used since the 4th century;
 "the practice of inner prayer, aiming at union with God on a level beyond images, concepts and language"; 
 "the quest for such union through the Jesus Prayer";
 "a particular psychosomatic technique in combination with the Jesus Prayer", use of which technique can be traced back at least to the 13th century;
 "the theology of St. Gregory Palamas", on which see Palamism.

Early Christian monasticism

Solitary ascetic life
Christian monasticism started with the legalisation of Christianity in the 4th century. The term hesychast is used sparingly in Christian ascetical writings emanating from Egypt from the 4th century on, although the writings of Evagrius and the Sayings of the Desert Fathers do attest to it. In Egypt, the terms more often used are anchoretism (Gr. , "withdrawal, retreat"), and anchorite (Gr. , "one who withdraws or retreats, i.e. a hermit").

The term hesychast was used in the 6th century in Palestine in the Lives of Cyril of Scythopolis. Many of the hesychasts Cyril describes were his own contemporaries; several of the saints about whom Cyril was writing, especially Euthymios and Savas, were in fact from Cappadocia. The laws (novellae) of the emperor Justinian I (r. 527–565) treat hesychast and anchorite as synonyms, making them interchangeable terms.

Inner prayer
The practice of inner prayer, which aims at "inward stillness or silence of the heart," dates back to at least the 4th century. Evagrius Ponticus (345–399), John Climacus (St. John of Sinai)(6th-7th century), Maximus the Confessor (c. 580–662), and Symeon the New Theologian (949–1022) are representatives of this hesychast spirituality. John Climacus, in his influential Ladder of Divine Ascent, describes several stages of contemplative or hesychast practice, culminating in agape.

The earliest reference to the Jesus prayer is in Diadochos of Photiki (c. 450); Evagrius, Maximus, nor Symeon refer to the Jesus prayer. Saint John Cassian (c. 360–435), who transmitted Evagrius Pontikos' ascetical teachings to the West, forming the basis of much of the spirituality of the Order of Saint Benedict and the subsequent western mystical tradition, presents as the formula used in Egypt for repetitive prayer "O God, make speed to save me: O Lord, make haste to help me."

Addition of psychosomatic techniques
St. Nicephorus the Hesychast (13th century), a Roman Catholic who converted to the Eastern Orthodox faith and became a monk at Mount Athos, advised monks to bend their heads toward the chest, “attach the prayer to their breathing” while controlling the rhythm of their breath, and "to fix their eyes during prayer on the 'middle of the body',” concentrating the mind within the heart in order to practice nepsis (watchfulness). While this is the earliest attestation of psychosomatic techniques in hesychast prayer, according to Kallistos Ware "its origins may well be far more ancient," influenced by the Sufi practice of dhikr, " the memory and invocation of the name of God," which in turn may have been influenced by Yoga practices from India, though it's also possible that Sufis were influenced by early Christian monasticism.

In the early 14th century, Gregory Sinaita (1260s–1346) learned a form of disciplined mental prayer from Arsenius of Crete, rooted in the tradition of John Climacus. In 1310, he went to Mount Athos, where he remained until 1335 as a monk at the Skete of Magoula near Philotheou Monastery, introducing hesychast practice there. The terms Hesychasm and Hesychast were used by the monks on Mount Athos to refer to the practice and to the practitioner of a method of mental ascesis that involves the use of the Jesus Prayer assisted by certain psychophysical techniques.

Hesychast controversy and Palamism

About the year 1337, hesychasm attracted the attention of Barlaam of Seminara, a Calabrian monk who at that time held the office of abbot in the Monastery of St Saviour in Constantinople and who visited Mount Athos. Mount Athos was then at the height of its fame and influence, under the reign of Andronicus III Palaeologus and under the leadership of the Protos Symeon. On Mount Athos, Barlaam encountered hesychasts and heard descriptions of their practices, also reading the writings of the teacher in hesychasm of St Gregory Palamas, himself an Athonite monk. Trained in Western Scholastic theology, Barlaam was scandalized by hesychasm and began to combat it both orally and in his writings. As a private teacher of theology in the Western Scholastic mode, Barlaam propounded a more intellectual and propositional approach to the knowledge of God than the hesychasts taught.

Barlaam took exception to the doctrine entertained by the hesychasts as to the nature of the light, the experience of which was said to be the goal of hesychast practice, regarding it as heretical and blasphemous. It was maintained by the hesychasts to be of divine origin and to be identical to the light which had been manifested to Jesus' disciples on Mount Tabor at the Transfiguration. This Barlaam held to be polytheistic, inasmuch as it postulated two eternal substances, a visible and an invisible God.

On the hesychast side, the controversy was taken up by St Gregory Palamas, afterwards Archbishop of Thessalonica, who was asked by his fellow monks on Mt Athos to defend hesychasm from the attacks of Barlaam. St Gregory himself was well-educated in Greek philosophy. St Gregory defended hesychasm in the 1340s at three different synods in Constantinople, and he also wrote a number of works in its defense.

In these works, St Gregory Palamas uses a distinction, already found in the 4th century in the works of the Cappadocian Fathers, between the energies or operations (Gr. energeiai) of God and the essence of God. St Gregory taught that the energies or operations of God were uncreated. He taught that the essence of God can never be known by his creature even in the next life, but that his uncreated energies or operations can be known both in this life and in the next, and convey to the hesychast in this life and to the righteous in the next life a true spiritual knowledge of God. In Palamite theology, it is the uncreated energies of God that illumine the hesychast who has been vouchsafed an experience of the uncreated light.

In 1341, the dispute came before a synod held at Constantinople and presided over by the Emperor Andronicus III; the synod, taking into account the regard in which the writings of the pseudo-Dionysius were held, condemned Barlaam, who recanted and returned to Calabria, afterwards becoming a bishop in the Catholic Church.

One of Barlaam's friends, Gregory Akindynos, who originally was also a friend of St Gregory Palamas, took up the controversy, which also played a role in the civil war between the supporters of John Cantacuzenus and John V Palaiologos. Three other synods on the subject were held, at the second of which the followers of Barlaam gained a brief victory. But in 1351 at a synod under the presidency of the Emperor John VI Cantacuzenus, hesychast doctrine was established as the doctrine of the Orthodox Church.

Introduction in Russia
St Paisius Velichkovsky and his disciples made the practice known in Russia and Romania, although hesychasm was already previously known in Russia, as is attested by St Seraphim of Sarov's independent practice of it.

Practice

Acquiring inner stillness
The hesychast interprets Jesus's injunction in the Gospel of Matthew to "go into your closet to pray" to mean that one should ignore the senses and withdraw inward. Saint John of Sinai writes:

Stages in hesychast practice

Theosis is obtained by engaging in contemplative prayer resulting from the cultivation of watchfulness (Gk: nepsis). According to the standard ascetic formulation of this process, there are three stages:
 Katharsis or purification,
 Theoria or illumination, and
 Theosis or deification (also referred to as union with God).

Katharsis (ascese/purification)

Sobriety contributes to this mental ascesis that rejects tempting thoughts; it puts a great emphasis on focus and attention. The hesychast is to pay extreme attention to the consciousness of his inner world and to the words of the Jesus Prayer, not letting his mind wander in any way at all. While he maintains his practice of the Jesus Prayer, which becomes automatic and continues twenty-four hours a day, seven days a week, the hesychast cultivates nepsis, watchful attention, to reject tempting thoughts (the "thieves") that come to the hesychast as he watches in sober attention in his hermitage. St. John of Sinai describes hesychast practice as follows:

The hesychast is to attach Eros, that is, "yearning", to his practice of sobriety so as to overcome the temptation to acedia (sloth). He is also to use an extremely directed and controlled anger against the tempting thoughts, although to obliterate them entirely he is to invoke Jesus Christ via the Jesus Prayer.

Much of the literature of hesychasm is occupied with the psychological analysis of such tempting thoughts (e.g. St. Mark the Ascetic). This psychological analysis owes much to the ascetical works of Evagrius Pontikos, with its doctrine of the eight passions.

Theoria (illumination)

The primary task of the hesychast is to engage in mental ascesis. The hesychast is to bring his mind (Gr. nous) into his heart so as to practise both the Jesus Prayer and sobriety with his mind in his heart. In solitude and retirement, the hesychast repeats the Jesus Prayer, "Lord Jesus Christ, son of God, have mercy on me, the sinner." The hesychast prays the Jesus Prayer 'with the heart'with meaning, with intent, "for real" (see ontic). He never treats the Jesus Prayer as a string of syllables whose "surface" or overt verbal meaning is secondary or unimportant. He considers bare repetition of the Jesus Prayer as a mere string of syllables, perhaps with a "mystical" inner meaning beyond the overt verbal meaning, to be worthless or even dangerous. This emphasis on the actual, real invocation of Jesus Christ mirrors an Eastern understanding of mantra in that physical action/voice and meaning are utterly inseparable.

The descent of the mind into the heart is not taken literally by the practitioners of hesychasm, but is considered metaphorically. Some of the psychophysical techniques described in the texts are to assist the descent of the mind into the heart at those times that only with difficulty it descends on its own.

The goal at this stage is a practice of the Jesus Prayer with the mind in the heart, which practice is free of images (see Pros Theodoulon). By the exercise of sobriety (the mental ascesis against tempting thoughts), the hesychast arrives at a continual practice of the Jesus Prayer with his mind in his heart and where his consciousness is no longer encumbered by the spontaneous inception of images: his mind has a certain stillness and emptiness that is punctuated only by the eternal repetition of the Jesus Prayer.

This stage is called the guard of the mind. This is a very advanced stage of ascetical and spiritual practice, and attempting to accomplish this prematurely, especially with psychophysical techniques, can cause very serious spiritual and emotional harm to the would-be hesychast. St. Theophan the Recluse once remarked that bodily postures and breathing techniques were virtually forbidden in his youth, since, instead of gaining the Spirit of God, people succeeded only "in ruining their lungs."

The guard of the mind is the practical goal of the hesychast. It is the condition in which he remains as a matter of course throughout his day, every day until he dies.

There is a very great emphasis on humility in the practice of the Jesus Prayer, great cautions being given in the texts about the disaster that will befall the would-be hesychast if he proceeds in pride, arrogance or conceit. It is also assumed in the hesychast texts that the hesychast is a member of the Orthodox Church in good standing.

Theosis (deification)

Theosis is from the guard of the mind that he is raised to contemplation by the grace of God.

The hesychast usually experiences the contemplation of God as light, the "uncreated light" of the theology of St. Gregory Palamas. The hesychast, when he has by the mercy of God been granted such an experience, does not remain in that experience for a very long time (there are exceptionssee for example the Life of St. Savas the Fool for Christ (14th century), written by St. Philotheos Kokkinos (14th century)), but he returns "to earth" and continues to practise the guard of the mind.

The uncreated light that the hesychast experiences is identified with the Holy Spirit. Experiences of the uncreated light are allied to the 'acquisition of the Holy Spirit'. Notable accounts of encounters with the Holy Spirit in this fashion are found in St. Symeon the New Theologian's account of the illumination of "George" (considered a pseudonym of St. Symeon himself); in the "conversation with Motovilov" in the Life of St. Seraphim of Sarov (1759–1833); and, more recently, in the reminiscences of Elder Porphyrios (Bairaktaris) of Kafsokalivia (Wounded by Love pp. 27–31).

Prelest
Orthodox tradition warns against seeking ecstasy as an end in itself. Hesychasm is a traditional complex of ascetical practices embedded in the doctrine and practice of the Orthodox Church and intended to purify the member of the Orthodox Church and to make him ready for an encounter with God that comes to him when and if God wants, through God's grace. The goal is to acquire, through purification and grace, the Holy Spirit and salvation. Any ecstatic states or other unusual phenomena which may occur in the course of hesychast practice are considered secondary and unimportant, even quite dangerous. Moreover, seeking after unusual "spiritual" experiences can itself cause great harm, ruining the soul and the mind of the seeker. Such a seeking after "spiritual" experiences can lead to spiritual delusion (Ru. prelest, Gr. plani)the antonym of sobrietyin which a person believes himself or herself to be a saint, has hallucinations in which he or she "sees" angels, Christ, etc. This state of spiritual delusion is in a superficial, egotistical way pleasurable, but can lead to madness and suicide, and, according to the hesychast fathers, makes salvation impossible.

Liturgy and sacraments
Hesychasts fully participate in the liturgical and sacramental life of the Orthodox Church, including the daily cycle of liturgical prayer of the Divine Office and the Divine Liturgy. However, hesychasts who are living as hermits might have a very rare attendance at the Divine Liturgy (see the life of Saint Seraphim of Sarov) and might not recite the Divine Office except by means of the Jesus Prayer (attested practice on Mt Athos). In general, the hesychast restricts his external activities for the sake of his hesychastic practice.

Texts
Books used by hesychasts include the Philokalia, a collection of texts on prayer and solitary mental ascesis written from the 4th to the 15th centuries, which exists in a number of independent redactions; the Ladder of Divine Ascent; the collected works of St. Symeon the New Theologian (949–1022); and the works of St. Isaac the Syrian (7th century), as they were selected and translated into Greek at the Monastery of St. Savas near Jerusalem about the 10th century.

Oriental Orthodox view of hesychasm 
Oriental Orthodox Christian clerics are "wary of the hesychastic practices of the Jesus Prayer that developed later in the Eastern churches". Fr. Matta el-Meskeen, a Coptic Orthodox clergyman, commented that hesychasm rid the concept of unceasing prayer from its simplicity, shifting "its ascetical position as a humbling practice by itself to a mystical position, with programs, stipulations, technical and mechanical bases, degrees, objectives, results".

Catholic opinions of hesychasm 
Western theologians have tended to reject hesychasm and the contention that, in the case of God, the distinction between essence and energies is real rather than, albeit with a foundation in reality, notional (in the mind). In their view, affirming an ontological essence-energies distinction in God contradicted the teaching of the First Council of Nicaea on divine unity. Adrian Fortescue, writing in the Catholic Encyclopedia (1909), claimed that "the real distinction between God's essence and operation remains one more principle, though it is rarely insisted on now, in which the Orthodox differ from Catholics." According to Fortescue, the Scholastic theory that God is pure actuality prevented Palamism from having much influence in the West, and it was from Western Scholasticism that hesychasm's philosophical opponents in the East borrowed their weapons.

In some instances these theologians equated hesychasm with quietism, an 18th century mystical revival codemned by the Catholic Church, perhaps because "quietism" is the literal translation of "hesychasm". However, according to Kallistos Ware, "To translate 'hesychasm' as 'quietism,' while perhaps etymologically defensible, is historically and theologically misleading." Ware asserts that "the distinctive tenets of the 17th-century Western quietists is not characteristic of Greek hesychasm."

The Catholic Church has never expressed any condemnation of Palamism, and uses in its liturgy readings from the work of Nicholas Kabasilas, a supporter of Palamas in the controversy that took place in the East. Its Liturgy of the Hours includes extracts from Kabasilas's Life in Christ on Tuesday, Wednesday, and Thursday of the Fifth Week of Easter in Year II of the two-year cycle for the Office of Readings.

The later 20th century saw a remarkable change in the attitude of Catholic theologians to Palamas, a "rehabilitation" of him that has led to increasing parts of the Western Church considering him a saint, even if uncanonized. Some Western scholars have argued that there is no conflict between Palamas's teaching and Catholic thought. According to Kallistos Ware, some Western theologians, both Catholic and Anglican, see the theology of Palamas as introducing an inadmissible division within God; however, others have incorporated his theology into their own thinking.

See also

 Barlaam of Calabria
 Caloyers
 Centering Prayer
 Dhikr
 Eastern Catholic Churches
 Eastern Orthodoxy
 Henosis
 Hesychia
 Imiaslavie
 Japa
 Jesus Prayer
 Lojong
 Mantra
 Maranatha
 Meditation
 Mysticism
 Philokalia
 Poustinia
 Prayer
 Pratyahara
 Quiet time
 Quietism
 Tabor Light
 The Way of a Pilgrim
 Theoria
 Theosis

Notes

References

Sources

 

 
 
 

 

 
 

Web-sources

Further reading 

Early monasticism
 The Philokalia.
 The Ladder of Divine Ascent by St John of Sinai.
 The Ascetical Homilies of St Isaac the Syrian.
 Works of St Symeon the New Theologian.
 Coenobitical Institutions and Conferences of St John Cassian.

19th-20th century
 The Way of the Pilgrim St Silouan the Athonite. (Contains an introduction by Archimandrite Sophrony (Sakharov), immediate disciple of St Silouan, together with the meditations of St Silouan (1866–1938).)
 Works of Archimandrite Sophrony (Sakharov) (1896–1993).
 Elder Joseph the Hesychast. (Life of a very influential Hesychast on Mt Athos who died in 1959.)
 Monastic Wisdom. The Letters of Elder Joseph the Hesychast.
 Wounded by Love. The Life and the Wisdom of Elder Porphyrios. (Reminiscences and reflections of Elder Porphyrios (1906–1991) of Mt Athos.)
 Works by Elder Paisios (1924–1994) of Mount Athos. (A very well known Athonite Elder and Hesychast.)
 Elder Ephraim of Katounakia. Translated by Tessy Vassiliadou-Christodoulou. (Life and teachings of Elder Ephraim (1912–1998) of Katounakia, Mt Athos, a disciple of Elder Joseph the Hesychast.)
 Hieromonachos Charalampos Dionusiates, O didaskalos tes noeras proseuches (Hieromonk Charalambos of the Monastery of Dionysiou, The Teacher of Mental Prayer).  (Life and teachings of Elder Charalambos (1910–2001), sometime Abbot of the Monastery of Dionysiou, Mt Athos, and a disciple of Elder Joseph the Hesychast. In Greek, available in English.)
 Works of Archimandrite Aimilianos (1934–2019) of the Monastery of Simonos Petra, Mt Athos, especially Volumes I and II.
 Counsels from the Holy Mountain. Selected from the Lessons and Homilies of Elder Ephraim. (Archimandrite Ephraim of the Monastery of St Anthony, Florence, Arizona. Formerly Abbot of the Monastery of Philotheou on Mt Athos, and a disciple of Elder Joseph the Hesychast. Not to be confused with Elder Ephraim of Katounakia.)

 Secondary
 Hesychasm: an annotated bibliography, Sergey S. Horujy, Moscow 2004.
 
 Paths to the Heart: Sufism and the Christian East, edited by James Cutsinger

External links

 "Hesychasm", Encyclopædia Britannica''
 The Origins of the Jesus Prayer, Kalistos Ware
 The Jesus Prayer, Orthodox Church in America
 Hesychasm in Orthodox Christian Tradition , St. Andrew Greek Orthodox Church
 The Neptic and Hesychastic Character of Orthodox Athonite Monasticism, Archimandrite Georgios, the Holy Monastery of St. Gregorios

 
Catholic–Eastern Orthodox ecumenism
Christian contemplation
Christian mysticism
Christian prayer
Christian terminology
Medieval Athos
Nondualism